Humbleton Hill is a hill in Northumberland, England, about  west of Wooler.

It is the location of the Battle of Homildon Hill of 1402, between English and Scottish armies. There is an archaeological site on the summit, with remains of an enclosed settlement of the Neolithic Age and a later Iron Age hillfort. It is a scheduled monument.

Description
The hill is part of the Cheviot Hills.

Prehistory
There are remains of a hillfort of the Iron Age, within an earlier enclosure thought to be of the Neolithic or Bronze Age. It is defined by a low bank of earth and stone; on the south side a steep ravine adds to the defence.

The more massive inner enclosure, dating from the Iron Age, measures  both north to south and west to east. On the south side the edge of the ravine provides the defence, and there is no rampart.

There are traces of 20 roundhouses, diameter , within the inner rampart, and about 8 roundhouses between the ramparts. There are remains of some small enclosures, thought to be medieval shielings or livestock pens, set against the hillfort enclosure and the outer bank.

References

Scheduled monuments in Northumberland
Archaeological sites in Northumberland
Hill forts in Northumberland
Hills of Northumberland